The 1999 Rivers State gubernatorial election occurred in Nigeria on January 9, 1999. The PDP nominee Peter Odili won the election, defeating the APP candidate.

Peter Odili emerged PDP candidate.

Electoral system
The governor of Tivers State is elected using the plurality voting system.

Primary election

PDP primary
The PDP primary election was won by Peter Odili.

Results
The total number of registered voters in the state was 2,207,000. Total number of votes cast was 747,296, while number of valid votes was 1,580,807. Rejected votes were 7,521.

References 

Rivers State gubernatorial elections
Rivers State
Rivers State gubernatorial election